Bendjelloul is a surname. Notable people with the surname include:

Johar Bendjelloul (born 1975), Swedish journalist and radio broadcaster
Malik Bendjelloul (1977–2014), Swedish documentary filmmaker and former child actor
Veronica Schildt Bendjelloul (born 1944), Swedish translator and mother of Johar and Malik Bendjelloul above